Lena & Gabor is an album by American vocalist Lena Horne and Hungarian guitarist Gábor Szabó, arranged and produced by Gary McFarland. It was recorded in 1969 and released on the Skye label. The album was Lena Horne's first album release in four years and saw her return to the charts with the single "Watch What Happens". The Skye Records label declared bankruptcy in 1970 and the backcatalog was acquired by Buddha Records and the album was re-issued in 1971 as Watch What Happens.

Reception
The Allmusic review states "Lena & Gabor is an unexpected delight, capturing a soulfulness and sass largely absent from the singer's previous efforts. Producer and arranger Gary McFarland's candy-coated orchestral settings afford Horne the opportunity to step out of the elegant but often stuffy refinement of her classic LPs and let down her hair".

Track listing
 "Rocky Raccoon" (John Lennon, Paul McCartney) - 3:30
 "Something" (George Harrison) - 3:09
 "Everybody's Talkin'" (Fred Neil) - 2:55 
 "In My Life" (Lennon, McCartney) - 2:56
 "Yesterday When I Was Young" (Charles Aznavour, Herbert Kretzmer) - 4:07  
 "Watch What Happens" (Michel Legrand, Norman Gimbel, Jacques Demy) - 4:01 
 "My Mood Is You" (Carl Sigman) - 4:43 
 "Message to Michael" (Burt Bacharach, Hal David) - 3:17 
 "Nightwind" (Robert Kessler, Robert Scott) - 3:39 
 "The Fool on the Hill" (Lennon, McCartney) - 3:45 
Recorded in Los Angeles, California and at A&R Recording Studios in New York between October and November 1969

Personnel
Lena Horne - vocals
Gábor Szabó - guitar
Eric Gale, Cornell Dupree - guitar 
Richard Tee - organ
Chuck Rainey - electric bass
Grady Tate - drums
Gary McFarland - arranger, conductor
Unknown strings and horns
The Howard Roberts Chorale - vocals
Howard Roberts - vocal arrangement

References

1970 albums
Albums conducted by Gary McFarland
Albums arranged by Gary McFarland
Albums produced by Gary McFarland
Albums produced by Gábor Szabó
Gábor Szabó albums
Lena Horne albums
Skye Records albums